The  (Banks of the Rhône) or  (Quays of the Rhône) refer to a series of parks, quays, streets and walking paths along the Rhône river in Lyon, France. The construction for the modern Berges du Rhône took place between 2005 and 2007, resulting in the development of 10 hectares of land on the left and right banks of the Rhône from Parc de la Tête d'Or to Parc de Gerland.

History of development 
Several dams were built during the nineteenth century to prevent flooding on the left bank of the Rhône, in particular the flood of 1856. The Grand Camp dam was built in 1859.

Modern development 
In 1984, the Lyon Fair was moved from its original location upstream of the quays of the Rhône near Parc de la Tete d'Or to Chassieu to become the Eurexpo. The vacant land was used to build Cité Internationale, which includes the Musée d'art contemporain de Lyon, cinemas, an auditorium, the Palais des congrès de Lyon and the global headquarters of Interpol.

The modern Berges du Rhône 
The modern Berges du Rhône were developed with the aim of creating a space for relaxation and leisure activities including paths for walking and cycling along the Rhône. Space was created by eliminating parking spaces.

In 2001 the Lyon city planning agency developed a scope statement outlining the goals for the project, which included removing parking spaces and introducing flood reduction measures. The project cost was estimated to be €15.5 million at the time. In 2002 the city released the design for the project.

A development team was chosen in 2003, and a consultation phase began the same year. During the consultation phase, the municipal opposition criticized the removal of parking spaces on the banks of the Rhône and their replacement with paid parking garages. In the second quarter of 2004, the project was presented in its final version. A budget of €44 million was finalized for the project.

In 2005 work began by eliminating parking along the Rhône and constructing several dolphin structures for mooring barges. Work was completed during the 3rd and 4th quarter of 2007.

Later development 
On the right bank Parc Saint-Clair was created, which stretches along the river from the entrance to Saint-Clair to Poincaré bridge.

Right bank 
The following quays were developed at the right bank of the Rhône:

 Quai Perrache Perrache
 Quai du Docteur Gailleton Bellecour
 Quai Jules Courmont Bellecour
 Quai Jean Moulin Cordeliers
 Quai André Lassagne Terreaux
 Cours D'Herbouville Croix-Rousse
 Cours Aristide Briand Caluire
 Quai Charles Sénard Saint-Clair

Left bank 

The following quays were developed on the left bank of the Rhône:
 Quai Charles de Gaulle Brotteaux
 Avenue de Grande-Bretagne Brotteaux
 Quai de Serbie Brotteaux
 Quai du général Sarrail Brotteaux
 Quai Victor-Augagneur La Part-Dieu
 Quai Claude Bernard Montplaisir
 Avenue Leclerc Gerland
 Quai Fillon Gerland

See also 

 Bridges of Lyon
 Parks in Lyon
 Parc de la Feyssine

References

Bibliography

External links 

 Official website 
 Official English tourism website

Linear parks
Parks in Lyon
Rhône
Streets in Lyon